Daniel Desmarquest is a French writer. He is best known for winning the Prix Medicis in 2002 for his book Kafka et les jeunes filles. 

Other works include SAD, Aqua bella, Lila Paradis and Les falaises d'Etretat.

References

21st-century French writers
Prix Médicis essai winners
Living people
Year of birth missing (living people)
20th-century births